Prasenjit Ghosh (born 1 June 1990) is an Indian footballer who last played as a goalkeeper for DSK Shivajians in the I-League.

Career statistics

Club
Statistics accurate as of 11 May 2013

References

Indian footballers
1990 births
Living people
Footballers from West Bengal
I-League players
ONGC FC players
Association football goalkeepers
DSK Shivajians FC players